Jazz Jackrabbit is a 2002 platform game developed by Game Titan and published by Jaleco under license from Epic Games. It is the third (not counting the unreleased Jazz Jackrabbit 3) and last game in the Jazz Jackrabbit series.

Gameplay
The game is a side-scroller Run 'n Gun platformer. Unlike previous titles in the Jazz Jackrabbit series, the player can aim their gun in all eight cardinal directions, being able to fix their aim by firing while standing still. Ammunition for various weapons can be found during stages, though those are fairly rare. During the stages you can also find money, which can be used in the intermissions between stages to buy ammunition or extra lives.

Multiplayer
This title brings back the multiplayer mode from JJ2, with 11 unique levels and support to up to four players through the GBA Link Cable. Only one copy on the game is necessary to enable the multiplayer mode.

Plot
The game begins as Jazz, during a routine mission, is captured by the Chameleon army on their home planet. Upon escaping, Jazz decides to retire from his job, but is prevented from doing so by R.A.B.T. HQ, which gives him a new mission to investigate a Saurian attack with the promise of a good money reward. Jazz discovers the involvement of the Turtle Army behind the attack, and upon following them he discovers his old nemesis Dark Shell, whom he believed dead, is seeking revenge on him for his previous defeat.

Reception
GameSpot named Jazz Jackrabbit the second-best Game Boy Advance game of January 2003, behind Karnaaj Rally.

References

External links

Video game reboots
2002 video games
Jaleco games
Run and gun games
Jazz Jackrabbit
Epic Games games
Game Boy Advance games
Game Boy Advance-only games
Video games about rabbits and hares
Video games developed in the United States
Multiplayer and single-player video games